Eslam Kandi (also Romanized as Eslām Kandī) is a village in Salavat Rural District, Moradlu District, Meshgin Shahr County, Ardabil Province, Iran. At the 2006 census, its population was 106, in 26 families.

References 

Towns and villages in Meshgin Shahr County